Echinoderidae is a family of kinorhynchs in the class Cyclorhagida.

Genera
Cephalorhyncha Adrianov & Malakhov, 1999
Echinoderes Clarapède, 1863
Fissuroderes Neuhaus & Blasche, 2006
Meristoderes Herranz, Thormar, Benito, Sánchez & Pardos, 2012
Polacanthoderes Sørensen, 2008

References

Kinorhyncha
Ecdysozoa families